Pervomaysky (masculine), Pervomayskaya (feminine), or Pervomayskoye (neuter) is a Russian language toponym that commemorates the International Labor Day holiday and may refer to:

Former Soviet Union
Pervomaysky District, several districts in the countries of the former Soviet Union

Azerbaijan
Pervomaysky, former name of Birinci Mayak
Pervomayskoye, alternative name of Bəhramtəpə, a village

Belarus 
Pervomayskaya (in Belarusian, Pyershamayskaya), a station in Minsk Metro

Kazakhstan
Pervomayskiy, Kazakhstan, a village in the Almaty Province

Kyrgyzstan
Pervomayskoye, Panfilov, a village in the Panfilov District, Chuy Province

Russia
Pervomaysky, Maykopsky District
Pervomaysky Okrug (disambiguation), name of various divisions
Pervomaysky Urban Settlement (or Pervomayskoye Urban Settlement), several municipal urban settlements
Pervomaysky, Russia (Pervomayskaya, Pervomayskoye), several inhabited localities
Pervomayskaya (Moscow Metro), a station of the Moscow Metro, Moscow
Pervomayskaya (closed) (1954–1961), a former station of the Moscow Metro, Moscow
Pervomayskaya (Ufa Metro), a station in Ufa Metro, which has not yet been completed

Ukraine 
Pervomaiskyi (Pervomaysky), a city of regional significance in Kharkiv Oblast
Pervomaisky, a town in the city of Snizhne, Donetsk Oblast
Pervomaisky, a small town near and west of the city of Pisky, Pokrovsk Raion, Donetsk Oblast
Pervomaisky, an island at Dnieper-Bug Estuary

See also
Pervomaysk (disambiguation)
Pervomaisc (disambiguation)
Pervomaiscoe (disambiguation)
Pervoye Maya (disambiguation)